Yerkovtsy is a rural locality (a selo) in Yerkovetsky Selsoviet of Ivanovsky District, Amur Oblast, Russia. The population was 932 as of 2018. There are 7 streets.

Geography 
Yerkovtsy is located near the right bank of the Kozlovka River, 37 km northeast of Ivanovka (the district's administrative centre) by road. Konstantinogradovka is the nearest rural locality.

References 

Rural localities in Ivanovsky District, Amur Oblast